The BAPS Shri Swaminarayan Mandir Christchurch is the third mandir in New Zealand of the Bochasanwasi Akshar Purushottam Swaminarayan Sanstha (BAPS). It is the only Hindu temple on the South Island of New Zealand. It officially opened on 26 June 2012.

History
Prior to February 2012, the mandir was opened for worship using photographs of statues of the Hindu deities. On 26 June 2012 statues that were blessed by Pramukh Swami were installed in the temple during a religious ceremony in Christchurch. All participated in the religious ritual called "mahapuja". The people who attended were given an idol frame plus a religiously blessed piece of cloth to drape over themselves at the Mahapuja.

BAPS entered Christchurch in 1993 with two followers in Christchurch. The temple had steady followers.

The North Island has four temples; in Auckland, Wellington, Rotorua and Hamilton. They regularly meet on a Sunday. This congregation is called "Ravi Sabha". The "Ravi Sabha" is followed by a dinner called "Mahaprasad"  which means "God's offering". In Hindu religion, it is believed that after worshipping God food should be offered to Him.

The Christchurch mandir is managed by the Asia Pacific region's management. The program is delivered from offices based in Atlanta, USA. A strict schedule is followed.

From 1993 to 2012, BAPS followers met regularly and celebrated all the festivals at social and community halls.

Deities
The following Gods have statues:

Guru followings (Guru Parampara) include Bhagatji Maharaj, Shastriji Maharaj, Yogiji Maharaj, Pramukh Swami Maharaj and current Guru Mahant Swami Maharaj

Priest
The mandir has a full-time priest. Religious procedures and practices are adhered to by him. He offers water, toothpaste and toothbrush to all the Gods. Then he offers breakfast, which is freshly made daily. He does Aarti at 7.30 am, offers lunch at 11 AM. After that, the Gods rest. The priest rests from 1 PM until 2:45. Then he offers fruit and water and at 4 PM opens the temple to the public, where he meets and greets congregants. He offers religious services by performing religious celebrations at people's homes or at temples.

Further reading
 The Christchurch Star, 27 June 2012
 Northwest News, 27 June 2012
 Swaminarayan Prakash July 2012

External links
 BAPS

21st-century Hindu temples
Swaminarayan temples